Yakov Dimitrov Matakiev was a public figure, politician and revolutionary activist.

Biography

Early life and education 
Yakov Dimitrov Matakiev was born on 13 September 1852 in Tatar Pazardzhik in a family of a rich nobleman. He got his education in his home town and graduated high school in Tábor. He began teaching alongside Konstantin Velichkov.

Revolutionary career 
He would first participate in the April Uprising of 1876, in which the uprising went unsuccessfully and he was arrested in the prisons of Plovdiv and Adrianople. He was then freed after the 1876-1877 amnesty of the Constantinople Conference.

Political career 
For the entire existence of Eastern Rumelia Yakov Matakiev was elected as a deputy and belonged to the party, which at the beginning was called Geshova, and from 1884 (when propaganda for the Unification began) - the Unificationist Party.

Matakiev was also the chairman of the Pazardzhik District Court. He was also mayor of Pazardzhik from 1893 to 1894.

References 
Bulgarian politicians
Bulgarian politician stubs
1852 births
1921 deaths